Françafrique is a French documentary film by Patrick Benquet, dedicated to the special relations between the French power and the former African colonies, after the independence acquired by these territories. The documentary was noticed in particular by the testimonies, which it includes, of former speakers.

Synopsis 
Fifty years before this documentary, in 1960, the French colonies in Africa became independent. But independence did not mean for the French power to lose all control and influence: General de Gaulle entrusted Jacques Foccart with the establishment of a system which aimed to keep control of the former colonies, by means, legal or illegal.

This system was called “Françafrique”, although this neologism was invented in 1955 by Félix Houphouët-Boigny to designate something else at the time, a hope for harmonious collaboration between the metropolis and its colonies on the African continent.

Behind these events, there is, from de Gaulle to Sarkozy, via François Mitterrand, a ruthless logic of support for African dictatorships, rigged elections, political crimes and corruption.

Awards

References 

French films based on actual events
2010 films
2010s French films